Overgrowth may refer to:

Botany and environment
Shrub and weed growth
Aufwuchs (German "surface growth" or "overgrowth") is the collection of small animals and plants that adhere to open surfaces

Medicine and biology
Hyperplasia
Inflammatory papillary hyperplasia, overgrowth of soft tissue, usually beneath a denture
Overgrowth syndrome  a group of genetic disorders in which there is an abnormal increase in the size of the body or a body part
Small intestinal bacterial overgrowth
Gingival overgrowth
Pityrosporum folliculitis part of the normal skin flora, which overgrows in certain conditions
Neural fibrolipoma overgrowth of fibro-fatty tissue along a nerve trunk that often leads to nerve compression
Perlman syndrome a rare overgrowth disorder present at birth
Achlorhydria complications of bacterial overgrowth and intestinal metaplasia and symptoms are often consistent with those
Retinopathy most often resulting from neovascularization or blood vessel overgrowth
Congenital hypertrophy of the lateral fold of the hallux condition involves "an overgrowth of the soft tissue" that can partially cover the nail plate
Leontiasis ossea Lion Face Syndrome, is a rare medical condition, characterized by an overgrowth of the facial and cranial bones
Hereditary gingival fibromatosis a rare condition of gingival overgrowth

Other uses
Overgrowth (video game), by Wolfire Games